Anabel Medina Garrigues and Virginia Ruano Pascual were the defending champions but did not participate that year.

The 2009 champions were Gisela Dulko and Flavia Pennetta who beat sisters, Alona and Kateryna Bondarenko, in the final, 6-2 7-6(4).

Seeds

Draw

Draw

External links
Doubles Draw

Doubles
Hobart International – Doubles